Valentijn Lietmeijer (born May 8, 1991) is a retired Dutch professional basketball player.

Career
Lietmeijers first professional club was Gasterra Flames from his hometown Groningen. After being named Dutch Basketball League Rookie of the Year, he left the club and joined Aris Leeuwarden

On August 9, 2013 Lietmeijer signed with Landstede Basketbal. On April 16, 2014 he scored a franchise record 10 three-point field goals, scoring 34 points in a home game against Challenge Sports Rotterdam. 

On June 23, 2015, he signed a 3-year deal with SPM Shoeters Den Bosch.

On August 2, 2017, Lietmeijer returned to Aris Leeuwarden.

After another year with injuries Lietmeijer decided to quit professional basketball in June 2018.

References

1991 births
Living people
Aris Leeuwarden players
Heroes Den Bosch players
Dutch Basketball League players
Dutch men's basketball players
Donar (basketball club) players
Landstede Hammers players
Shooting guards
Sportspeople from Groningen (city)